The 1925 Chicago Cardinals season resulted in the Cardinals winning their first NFL championship. The 1925 championship is contested and never awarded by the NFL after the Pottsville Maroons were suspended.

The end of the Cardinals season was centered on two historic, but controversial, situations. The first was a team scandal with the Milwaukee Badgers. The scandal involved a Chicago player, Art Folz, hiring a group of high school football players to play for the Milwaukee Badgers, against the Cardinals. This would ensure an inferior opponent for Chicago. The game was used to help prop up their win–loss percentage and as a chance of wresting the 1925 championship away from the first place Pottsville Maroons. When NFL president Joseph Carr learned high school players had been used in a league game, he told reporters the 58–0 Cardinals win would be stricken from the record. However, the league had never got around to removing it and the game is still a part of the NFL records. Cardinals' owner Chris O'Brien was also fined $1,000 by Carr for allowing his team play a game against high schoolers, even though O'Brien claimed that he was unaware of the players' status. Finally Badgers' owner, Ambrose McGuirk, was ordered to sell his Milwaukee franchise within 90 days. Folz, for his role, was barred from football for life.

However, by the summer of 1926, the $1,000 fine against O'Brien was rescinded, probably since the amount would have put the Cardinals out of business. McGuirk though had already sold his Badgers franchise to Johnny Bryan, a fullback with the Chicago Bears. Two of the high school football players used in scandal even earned high school all-star recognition at the end of their season. Art Folz reportedly told the high schoolers that the game was a "practice game" and would in no part affect their amateur status.

The Milwaukee scandal did have implications for the 1925 NFL Championship and the second controversy. In December 1925, the Pottsville Maroons had their title removed by the NFL and given to the Cardinals for playing in an unsanctioned game against the Notre Dame All-Stars. To this day, Pottsville residents and supporters still demand to know why Chicago was awarded the title even though they too were found by Carr to have violated the NFL's rules. According to Bob Carroll of the Professional Football Researchers Association, "The Cardinals didn't defy the league", Carroll said. "Pottsville did. It was a great team, but the owner made a mistake." However, it is still not entirely known if O'Brien knew of the high school players on the Badgers team.

For his part, Cardinals owner Chris O'Brien refused to accept the championship title for his team. At the owners' meeting after the season was over, he argued that his team did not deserve to take the title over a team which had beaten them fairly. It appears that his reasons for scheduling the Milwaukee and Hammond games had been not to take the title, but rather to convince the cross-town Chicago Bears to play his team again – the Bears, with Red Grange in their roster, were a very lucrative draw. The NFL said it would revisit the issue later, but never did. It was only later, under the ownership of Charles Bidwill and his son Bill Bidwill, that the Cardinals began claiming the championship title.

Regular season

 Game in italics was against a non-NFL team.

Standings

References

Cardinals on Pro Football Reference

Chicago Cardinals
Arizona Cardinals seasons
National Football League championship seasons
Chicago